Gautam Yadav is an Indian gay rights activist. Gautam has been on the board of several national and international organisations including UNAIDS Youth advisory forum (Asia Pacific), Youth Voices Count, Youth LEAD and more. Gautam was awarded with LGBT heroes award in Bangkok by APCOM in 2017. Gautam has worked with India HIV/AIDS Alliance and now works with Humsafar Trust.

References 

Living people
Indian LGBT rights activists
People with HIV/AIDS
Year of birth missing (living people)